Gerasimos "Makis" Kanellos (born ) is a Greek male volleyball player. He is part of the Greece men's national volleyball team. He currently plays for AEK.

References

External links
 profile at FIVB.org
 profile, club career, info at greekvolley.gr (in Greek)

1987 births
Living people
Greek men's volleyball players
Olympiacos S.C. players
Panathinaikos V.C. players
PAOK V.C. players
Iraklis V.C. players
Place of birth missing (living people)
Volleyball players from Athens